Toxic waste is waste material that can cause death, injury or birth defects to living creatures.

Toxic waste may also refer to:

 Toxic Waste (candy), the sour confectionery
 Toxic Waste (band), the rock band
 Toxic Waste (EP), a 2012 split EP by Toxic Holocaust and Municipal Waste
 A slang term for a toxic asset, such as collateralized debt obligations for subprime mortgages